The 2022 Illinois Fighting Illini football team was an American football team that represents the University of Illinois in the West Division of the Big Ten Conference during the 2022 NCAA Division I FBS football season. Bret Bielema was in his second season as the team's head coach. The Fighting Illini played home games at Memorial Stadium in Champaign, Illinois.

Key players included senior quarterback Tommy DeVito and junior running back Chase Brown.

Previous season
The Illini finished the 2021 season 5–7, 4–5 in Big Ten play to finish fifth place in the West division.

Schedule
Illinois announced its 2022 football schedule on January 12, 2022. The 2022 schedule consists of seven home games and five away games in the regular season. The Fighting Illini will host Big Ten foes Iowa, Minnesota, Michigan State, and Purdue and will travel to Indiana, Wisconsin, Nebraska, Michigan and Northwestern. The Fighting Illini will host all three of their non-conference opponents, Wyoming from the Mountain West, Virginia from ACC, and Chattanooga from Division I FCS.

Game summaries

Wyoming

at Indiana

Virginia

No. 10 (FCS) Chattanooga

at Wisconsin

Iowa

Source: Box Score

Illinois won for the first time in nine tries in the series. It was also former Iowa player and coach Bret Bielema's first game at Illinois against Iowa, as he missed the 2021 meeting due to issues relating to COVID-19.

Minnesota

at Nebraska

Michigan State

Purdue

at No. 3 Michigan

at Northwestern

vs. No. 22 Mississippi State (ReliaQuest Bowl)

Rankings

Roster

Coaching staff

References

Illinois
Illinois Fighting Illini football seasons
Illinois Fighting Illini football